The 1931 North Carolina State Wolfpack football team season was an American football team that represented North Carolina State University as a member of the Southern Conference (SoCon) during the 1931 college football season. In its 1st season under head coach John "Clipper" Smith, the team compiled a 3–6 record (2–4 against SoCon opponents), tied for 17th place in the conference, and was outscored by a total of 104 to 60.

Schedule

References

NC State
NC State Wolfpack football seasons
NC State Wolfpack football